Girl, Missing is an English-language young adult thriller novel by Sophie McKenzie, published in 2006.

It won the 2007 Bolton Children's Book Award, the 2008 Manchester Book Award and the 2007 Red House Children's Book Award for Older Readers, as well as being longlisted for the Carnegie Medal.
It was also one of the books picked for the Richard & Judy Children's Book Club.

Plot
Curious about her birth parents, fourteen-year-old Lauren Matthews goes on a website called Missing-Children.com and finds an American girl named Martha Lauren Purditt, who went missing less than two months before Lauren was adopted. A few days later, she finds a diary containing details about her adoption and the name Sonia Holtwood 

After persuading her family to go on a holiday to America, Lauren and her friend James (AKA "Jam") sneak off and meet with Taylor Larsen, the owner of the agency which handled Lauren's adoption. He refuses to show Lauren her adoption file, but when Lauren mentions Sonia Holtwood, Taylor tells Lauren she was looked after by Sonia before she was adopted.

Lauren and Jam set out to find Sonia. They run into a female police officer named Suzanna Sanders, who gives them a ride in her car and offers them orange juice. Once in the car, Lauren and Jam begin to feel sleepy. Hours later, they wake up and find that their phones and belongings have been taken away. They ask Officer Sanders where they are and demand to be let out of the car. She reveals she is Sonia Holtwood and the orange juice was drugged. Sonia dumps them in the middle of nowhere and takes off with their phones and belongings. They are rescued by a man called Glane, who takes them to Boston, where he works. Lauren discovers that Martha's parents were Annie and Sam Purditt, who live in Evanport. Glane offers to take her there.

When Lauren meets the Purditts, Annie is the only one who believes her story, while the others are skeptical. They consider taking a DNA test to see if Lauren is really part of their family. The DNA results confirm that Lauren is indeed the daughter of Annie and Sam Purditt. Lauren's adoptive parents tell her they adopted her believing her to be Sonia's child, without realizing she had been kidnapped. Nonetheless, they are accused of abduction and taken to prison. Still missing her adoptive family terribly, Lauren argues with Annie, claiming that Annie doesn't love her. Annie replies that she almost committed suicide after Lauren went missing.

Lauren moves in with her two sisters, Shelby and Madison, but has trouble fitting in with the rest of the family. She begins receiving threatening text messages telling her to "keep quiet or die." At first she believes Shelby is the one sending them, but it turns out to be Sonia Holtwood. Finally, Holtwood sends Lauren a text saying that her sister will die unless she goes to Sam's boat, the Josephine May. There, she finds Madison gagged and Sonia with a paid criminal called Frank. Jam appears as the boat starts to sink with everyone still trapped inside. When Jam has rescued them, Madison was still unconscious. 

In the hospital, Annie and Lauren share a true mother–daughter moment, where Lauren sees Annie for who she truly is. Back at Sam and Annie's house, Lauren meets her adoptive parents at the door; they say that they have been released from jail and have been invited there by Sam and Annie. All of them have a conversation and Lauren is asked who she wants to live with: her birth parents or her adoptive parents. She replies that she chooses both. Lauren then goes to the marina with Jam.

References 

2006 British novels
2006 children's books
British children's novels
Works about adoption
Novels set in Vermont